Mginskoye Urban Settlement is an urban settlement (городское поселение) in the Kirovsky District of Leningrad Oblast, Russia. Population: 
It consists of the urban settlement Mga and 18 villages.

References

Urban-type settlements in Leningrad Oblast